= Juhö =

German motorcycle company (1922–1925)

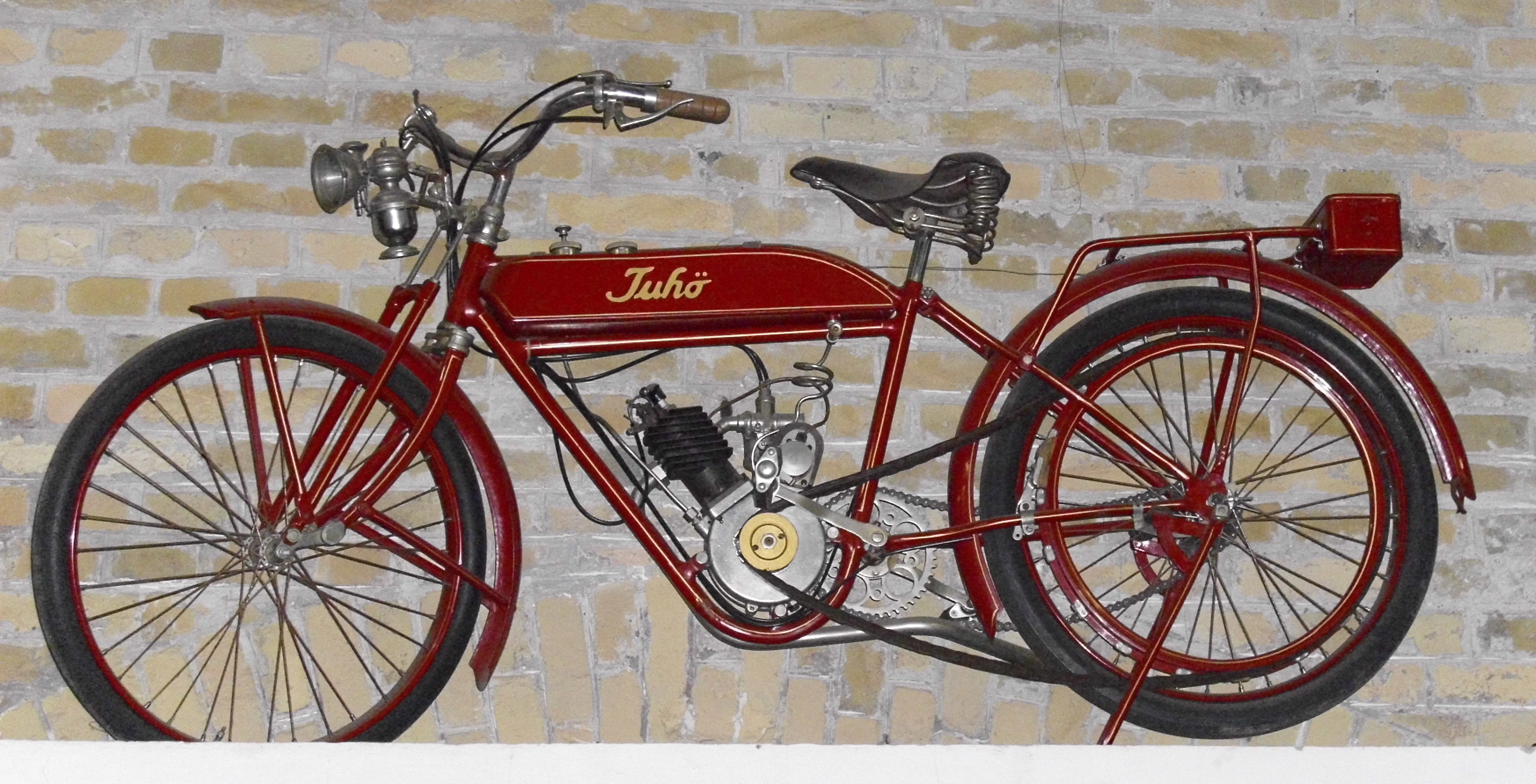
Juhö motorcycle in the Transport Museum of Bratislava

Juhö was a German motorcycle company active from 1922 to 1925, named after founder Julius Höflich. It was based in Fürth, Bavaria.

In 1922 only, Juhö also manufactured some automobiles; the cars with a small 400 cc two-stroke engine were economically unsuccessful.

== Literature ==
David Burgess Wise, The New Illustrated Encyclopedia of Automobiles
